Altkirch is a commune in the Haut-Rhin department in Alsace in north-eastern France.

The town is traditionally regarded as the capital of Sundgau.

Etymology
The name of the commune means old church ( or Àlta Kìrech).

History 
In the 1370s, the citizens of Altkirch made battle and won against a company of Gugler mercenaries.

Demography

Its inhabitants are known as Altkirchois.

The resident population number of 5500 is rather deceptive as some 15,500 people will be in town on a typical working day (4500 working, 3000 studying, 3000 for medical treatment and another 5000 divided between shopping, administrative offices, cultural and sporting activities).

Sister cities
Azerbaijan (Nagorno-Karabakh) Füzuli (2016)

See also
 Château d'Altkirch - destroyed castle in the town.
 Communes of the Haut-Rhin department

References

External links

 Altkirch and Sundgau Community 
 Weather in Haut-Rhin 
 Photographic visit to Altkirch 
 Rhenish centre for Contemporary Art 

Communes of Haut-Rhin
Subprefectures in France